Bergerhausen is a central borough of the city of Essen, Germany, located south of the city centre (Stadtkern). It was incorporated into the city in 1910. Before it had been part of the Bürgermeisterei Rellinghausen (Rellinghausen district). Around 11.700 people live here.

Bergerhausen was first mentioned in 943 as Bergarahuson.

Geography 
Bergerhausen borders the boroughs of Steele and Überruhr-Hinsel to the east, Rellinghausen and Stadtwald to the south, Rüttenscheid in the west, and Huttrop in the north.

Sources 

Essen